The Brantental, also Brandental, is a valley in South Tyrol, Italy, stretching from Laives to Deutschnofen.

References 
Alpenverein South Tyrol 

Valleys of South Tyrol